The Rosebud Hotel is a historic former hotel building at 7 Circle Drive in Rosebud, South Dakota, the government center of the Rosebud Indian Reservation.  It is a -story wood-frame structure, three bays wide, with a hip roof and multiple chimneys.  A single-story hip-roofed porch extends across the central portion of the main facade, sheltering a doorway flanked by sidelight windows.  The hotel was built in 1879, one year after the reservation was established, to house visiting government officials and unmarried employees of the Bureau of Indian Affairs.  It was converted to apartments in 1937, and later housed as the tribal offices of the Brulé Sioux who live on the reservation.

The building was listed on the National Register of Historic Places in 1980.

See also
National Register of Historic Places listings in Todd County, South Dakota

References

Hotel buildings on the National Register of Historic Places in South Dakota
Hotel buildings completed in 1879
Buildings and structures in Todd County, South Dakota
National Register of Historic Places in Todd County, South Dakota
Rosebud Indian Reservation